The Church of St. Joseph is the Catholic parish church for St. Joseph Parish, a national parish in New York City founded in 1873 to serve the German-speaking residents of the Yorkville neighborhood on the Upper East Side of Manhattan.

History
After the Civil War, many German families sought more pleasant surroundings than were to be found in their original enclave of Little Germany on the city's Lower East Side and found it in Yorkville. The German Redemptorists, who served the Church of the Most Holy Redeemer in their old neighborhood, opened St. Joseph's Orphan Asylum at Avenue A and East 89th Street to provide the children more open and green space. It was staffed by the School Sisters of Notre Dame, based in Bavaria, who taught their students entirely in German. At that time, the only Catholic Church in the area was the Church of St. Laurence O'Toole, which was run by the Jesuit Fathers on what was to become Park Avenue. The German Catholics who moved into the area relied for church services in their native tongue on a chapel at the orphanage.

In 1873 a delegation of the German Catholic community in Yorkville approached Thomas Ouellet, S.J., the Rector of St. Laurence Parish, who by Church law was their official pastor, and requested that the Jesuits provide a German-speaking priest for a new parish be established to serve their needs. They agreed and referred this request to John McCloskey, the Archbishop of New York, who authorized the establishment of the Parish of St. Joseph. The Jesuits were initially entrusted with its administration and Joseph Durthaller, S.J., was sent to serve as its first pastor. A small church was quickly built and dedicated by McCloskey in 1874. A school for the children of the parish was opened in the orphanage in December 1880.

The Archdiocese of New York assumed complete control of the parish in 1888, and assigned Monsignor Anton Lammel as the first pastor from among the clergy of the archdiocese. Lammel soon felt that the current church was no longer adequate to the needs of his growing congregation and started to plan for a new church. Construction on the new church began in 1894 under the architect J. William Schickel and was completed the following year. The new church boasted of an organ made by the noted firm of Müller & Abel, which is still in use.

Lammel served as pastor until 1911, when he was succeeded by Monsignor Gallus Bruder (1911–1943). Among various other improvements which Galler made to the parish facilities was the building of a parochial school to accommodate the large expansion of the German population moving into the neighborhood after the General Slocum disaster of 1904 and the completion of the church's bell tower. Both were completed in 1926.

Current
The German community for which Yorkville was long known began to disperse in the 1970s, as the many German eateries in the area began to disappear. The parish currently numbers some 700 parishioners. Mass in German, however, continues to be celebrated at the church monthly. Additionally, with the closing in August 2015 of the nearby Church of St. Stephen of Hungary, which had served the Hungarian population of the city, services in the Hungarian language began to be celebrated at St. Joseph's Church on September 6 of that year.

References

External links
 
 "Manhattan Pastor Faces Up to Drug Dealers, With Prayer and a Petition", NYT

National parishes
Romanesque Revival church buildings in New York City
Roman Catholic churches in Manhattan
Religious organizations established in 1873
Roman Catholic churches completed in 1874
Roman Catholic churches completed in 1895
German-American culture in New York City
Yorkville, Manhattan
1873 establishments in New York (state)
19th-century Roman Catholic church buildings in the United States